Mendicant monasteries in Mexico were one of the architectural solutions devised by the friars of the mendicant orders in the 16th century to the evangelization in the New Spain. The religious function of these buildings was thought for an enormous number of Amerindian indigenous people to evangelize although soon, due to the policy of reduction, the whole became the social center of the pueblos de indios, transmitting to them the civil modes of the West, Castilian, various arts and crafts, health, and even funeral services. 

The buildings were based on architectural styles that were already in disuse for the time, such as Romanesque and Gothic, and on the European monastic model – essentially on the Cluny Abbey – but they added innovative elements such as the atrial cross and the capilla abierta, as well as being characterized by various decorative currents and a strong appearance as fortresses. Within these buildings, distributed in the center of modern Mexico, is found an art originated both in stone carving and in pictorial decoration: the tequitqui or Indochristian art, a kind of style made by the indigenous people who made art in the buildings based on European patterns and directed by the friars.

Ideological inspirations
The mendicant friars expressed in its buildings by means of architectural, sculptural and painterly desires -based on millennialism, the joachinism and in the counter-reformation, expressing with influences that are distant in time and space, the will of the refoundation of the church in the New World. Entrusted with the task of evangelization of the newly conquered Mesoamerican Indians, the friars created with the whole monastery a sum of didactic and symbolic elements, with iconographic programs and diverse elements that condensed the beliefs accumulated by mendicant experience in similar tasks in Europe, Asia and Africa.

The monastic buildings in all their elements included a voluntarily Medieval load and ancient appearance (archaizing), using their builders influences used several centuries earlier in Europe, but with 16th century techniques.

Romanesque elements 

 The dimension of the naves 
 The thickness of the walls
 The use of buttresses, flying buttresses, rounded arches
 Use of bell-gables serving as bell towers
 Sculptures on facades
 Barrel vaults made of stone

Gothic elements 

 Ascentional direction
 Decorative rib vaults rather than functional or supporting 
 Rose windows of stone. Example is preserved in Yecapixtla, Morelos.
 Pointed arches
 Segmental arches type basket arch in the cloisters, mainly.

Mudéjar elements 
 Decoration with yeserias
 Use of alfarjes
 Spaces with arcades. An example is the chapel of San Gabriel Franciscan Convent, Cholula

The mendicant buildings of the 16th century have a similar distribution in their basic elements to the European monasteries, as well as in their decoration and constructive characteristics when they are built under the direction of the friars themselves with manuals of the Old World. Its builders kept symmetries and measures that imitated in an archaic way the scheme of the Benedictine monastery of the 4th century, which had the same stereotomy of warlike inspiration, with thick walls and buttresses, significant height with an ascensional direction and merlons, among other elements, similar to the Europeans who constituted military strongholds against Moors or Saracens.

Architectural structure 

The construction and arrangement of the buildings was carried out with the intention of returning to the primitive church, with solutions and spaces designed to keep the regula of St. Benedict of Nursia.

Atrium
The atrium was a unique solution in New Spain as a characteristic devised by the friars when occupied as massive squares for the celebration of mass, although with the passage of time as shown by priest Diego de Valadés in his Rhetorica christiana, the atrium became the main space of the social life of the indigenous as it was the main space of reproduction of Western civilization. There, European arts and crafts, Spanish language and religious and civil precepts were taught.

The primary function of the atrium was to carry out every kind of religious celebration in addition to the mass, such as processions and theatrical performances that the indigenous people liked (edifying theatre) as a didactic form of teaching. The indigenous peoples accepted the holding of mass outdoor ceremonies, since Mesoamerica was a common practice.

Atrial cross

At the central point of the atrium and as a symbolic and geographical place of the foundation of the town, a stone cross was placed on a base. The elements contained in it were attributes of Passion of Jesus.

Wall in the atrium
The atrial space was delimited by an atrial wall, which also coincided as reminiscence of the coatepantlis of the ceremonial centers of the Mesoamerican peoples. It was usually decorated with almenados and finely decorated finishes. Only in the case of the atrium of Molango, Puebla, was a spadaña exempt from the Temple placed in the atrial fence.

Processional path
One of the most recurrent resources was the mass processions. Its route was delimited on the perimeter of the atrial wall with shrubs, small walls or trees.

Capilla posa

On the four corners of the atrium were built four chapels -an original feature of New Spain- vaulted and decorated and which had the function of posing or resting the Blessed Sacrament in the processions made after mass. These were assigned to the care of each of the neighborhoods of the towns, so they have also been called "capillas de comunidad" or "capillas de indios". They include Huejotzingo and Calpan in Puebla.

Church

In many populations of present-day Mexico, churches of the sixteenth century exist with identifiable architectural characteristics and rising because of their height above the populations in which they settle, since several of them were built on Mesoamerican teocallis (as in Texcoco, Tlaxcala, Huejotzingo, Cholula, Tula and Huexotla) in order to "disintegrate more the old way of life and sustenance a cult over the other". It is remarkable in all the monasteries erect impregnable in populations that currently have few inhabitants, but centuries ago they were important centers of population; this effect was achieved with the ascensional direction of its walls and the thickness of them, as well as the use of flying buttresses, buttresses and a plant originally of rasa nave.

Nave
Although many monasteries have been modified by the addition of bell towers, side naves or plant of a Latin cross during colonial times in later centuries, the majority were built with a single nave and a rectangular, slightly trapezoidal in the apse, with a roof of palm or artesonado, which was replaced by arched stone barrel vault ornamented with ribs attached (gothic, without any structural function, and voluntarily archaic).

Monasteries by state

State of Mexico
Church and Convent of San Agustín, Acolman

Hidalgo
See: Mendicant monasteries of Hidalgo

Michoacán
See: Conventual Missions of Michoacán

Morelos 

 Yecapixtla
 Cathedral of Cuernavaca
 Ocuituco
 Tepoztlán
 Tetela del Volcán (franciscan)
 Oaxtepec (franciscan)
 Atlatlahucan
 Jiutepec
 Ocotepec
 Yautepec
 Hueyapan
 Tlatizapan
 Tlaquitenango
 Tlayacapan
 Totolapan
 Tlanepantla
 Pazulco
 Jonacatepec
 Zacualpan
 Jantetelco
 Jumiltepec

Oaxaca 
Dominicans:

 San Miguel Achiutla
 Coixtlahuaca
 Cuilapan de Guerrero
 Coatlán
 Etla
 Ixtepexi
 Nejapa
 Ocotlán de Morelos
 Tonalá
 Santo Tomás Tamazulapan
 San Juan Teposcolula
 Tecomaxtlahuaca
 Tlaxiaco
 Totontepec Villa de Morelos
 Santo Domingo Yanhuitlán

Puebla 
 Huejotzingo
 Calpan
 Cholula
 Molango
 Huauchinango

Querétaro
See: Franciscan Missions in the Sierra Gorda

Tlaxcala
See: Mendicant monasteries of Tlaxcala

Contemporary studies
The historiography on the subject -art historian Manuel Toussaint being the first to call it that- has called them "convents-fortress", due to the recitation and elements of military inspiration with which they were built. The main scholar of these buildings, George Kubler, cited in his Mexican architecture of the sixteenth century the military futility in the event of a possible Indigenous attack, which occurred in Xilitla, San Luis Potosí, in 1548. The historian Arturo Schroeder Cordero stressed its importance against other architectural solutions such as skyscrapers.

See also
Indochristian art

References

Monasteries in Mexico
Mendicant orders
16th-century architecture
Spanish missions in North America